Alvar Alfred Norgard (November 3, 1907 – November 20, 1975) was an end in the National Football League who played for the Green Bay Packers.
Norgard played collegiate ball for Stanford University before playing professional ball for one season in 1934.  Norgard retired the same year.

References

1907 births
1975 deaths
People from Fort Bragg, California
Stanford Cardinal football players
Green Bay Packers players
Players of American football from California